Kim Ki-bum (born September 23, 1991), better known by his stage name Key, is a South Korean rapper, singer, dancer, songwriter, actor, fashion designer and television presenter. Born and raised in Daegu, South Korea, he later travelled to Seoul after a successful audition at the SM National Tour Audition Casting. In May 2008, Key debuted as a member of South Korean boy group Shinee, who later went on to become one of the best-selling artists in South Korea. Key is widely recognized as a singer and rapper, but he has also ventured into different careers, notably as an actor and fashion designer.

As a singer, he has collaborated with various artists, and formed the duo Toheart with Woohyun of Infinite. He made his debut as a soloist in November 2018 with the release of the digital single "Forever Yours", and his first studio album, Face, was released later that month. Key has also contributed to songwriting for Shinee's and Toheart's albums. As an actor, he was cast in multiple musicals, such as Bonnie & Clyde (2013), Zorro (2014), and Chess (2015). He has since widened his field as an actor by taking part in several television drama roles, like Drinking Solo (2016) and The Guardians (2017).

In 2015, Key progressed to becoming a fashion designer and took part in numerous projects. For instance, he collaborated with Bridge Shop House to design Shinee concert outfits, and worked with model Irene Kim and the brand Charm's to design fashion apparel. Due to the success of his works, Key was later appointed as fashion director of the group. In 2016, he became a model for the American fashion brand Jill Stuart.

Life and career

1991–2011: Early life and career beginnings

Key was born on September 23, 1991, in Daegu, South Korea, as an only child. At the age of 14, he represented Yeong Shin Middle School in his hometown as a water-skier and competed in water-skiing competitions. In 2006, he joined SM Entertainment after a successful audition at the SM National Tour Audition Casting. One year later, he appeared as a background dancer in the film Attack on the Pin-Up Boys.

In 2008, he was chosen as a member of the group Shinee. The group released their first extended play, Replay on May 22, peaking at number eight on the charts. They held their first performance on May 25, 2008, on the SBS program  Inkigayo.

Shortly after debut, Key appeared on television shows such as Idol Maknae Rebellion as a guest star alongside his Shinee bandmates. Key was also a cast member of the show Raising Idol along with Dongho from U-KISS and Thunder from MBLAQ. In addition, Key participated in labelmate Xiah's solo performance of "Xiahtic" in TVXQ's concert 2009: The 3rd Asia Tour Mirotic in Seoul. In 2010, he featured on the song "Healing" on TRAX's EP Let You Go, and on Girls' Generation's song "Boys & Girls" for their second studio album, Oh!. In 2011, Key collaborated with Leeteuk of Super Junior on a song called "Bravo" for the drama History of a Salaryman. He also took part in Exo's song "Two Moons" on their debut EP Mama and BoA's song "One Dream" as the theme song for SBS K-pop Star with labelmate Henry of Super Junior-M.

2012–2015: Toheart and theatrical debut

In 2012, Key was cast as Frank Abagnale Jr. in the Korean production of Broadway musical Catch Me If You Can, marking his theatrical debut. He rotated the role with Um Ki-joon, Kim Jeong-hoon, Park Gwang-hyun and labelmate Kyuhyun. The musical ran from March 28 to June 10 at the Blue Square, Samsung Card Hall, in Hannam-dong, Seoul. In October, it was announced that Key would participate in the return of the musical. The production started on December 14, 2012, and continued until February 9, 2013, at the Opera House in the Seongnam Arts Center. Key also made a cameo appearance in SBS sitcom Salamander Guru and The Shadows.

On July 18, 2013, it was announced that Key was cast as Clyde in the Korean production of Bonnie & Clyde, alongside the cast Kim Min-jong, Um Ki-joon, Dana of The Grace, and Hyungsik of ZE:A. The performance ran at the Chungmu Art Hall in Seoul from September 4 until October 27, 2013. Shortly after, he was cast in The Three Musketeers as D'Artagnan.

In 2014, Key formed the duo Toheart with Woohyun from Infinite, a collaboration between SM Entertainment and Woollim Entertainment. According to the members, it was their idea to form a duo since they were close friends, but they weren't thinking of a musical collaboration, instead of photoshoots and similar activities. The duo was well received, winning the Popularity Award at the 29th Golden Disc Awards. Jeff Benjamin from Billboard praised their vocals, as well as their choreography and on-screen charisma. In the same year, Key was cast as the lead role in the musical Zorro, sharing the role with singer Wheesung and Beast's Yoseob. Zorro ran from August 27 to October 26 at the Chungmu Art Hall in Seoul. Key also participated in the MBC variety show We Got Married Global Edition. He was partnered with Alissa Yagi, a Japanese model.

In January 2015, Key joined the cast of SM Entertainment's hologram musical School Oz. In March 2015, Key and CNBLUE's Jung-shin were appointed as the main presenters of Mnet's M Countdown. In the same year, Key collaborated with Axodus, a duo formed by Don Spike and DJ Hanmin. Key provided vocals for the track "Hold On", which they performed together at the Ansan Valley Rock Festival on July 25, 2015. He took further musical roles in Chess and In the Heights, the latter of which was later performed with Japanese subtitles at Kanagawa Arts Theatre in Yokohama in 2016. Key starred in his first play as Byeong-gu in Save the Green Planet!, based on the 2003 film of the same name. He also had his own web show entitled Key's Know How produced by Mnet.

2016–2017: Acting roles

In September 2016, Key made his official acting debut in the tvN drama Drinking Solo which aired from September 5 to October 25. He took the role of a student who had been studying for the civil service exam for three years. Although this was Key's first time acting in a television series, his acting was well received by the production team, stating: "Key is someone who works hard. He prepared a lot beforehand and as an actor, he comprehensively analysed his character role. He is receiving much praise and love from the staff. Despite having no experience in dramas at the time of his audition, his acting gave off a very fresh vibe. Furthermore, his acting and his enunciation were good and so we decided to cast him."

In April 2017, Key was announced as one of the main characters for the new MBC drama The Guardians. In the drama, Key plays the role of Gong Kyung-soo, a skater and a hacker whose mother went missing due to a crime and received positive reviews for his acting skills. He subsequently received the Best New Actor Award at the 2017 Grimae Awards.

2018–2019: Solo debut and military enlistment
Key joined the variety show DoReMi Market as a cast member in February 2018. He featured on Years & Years' remix of their single "If You're Over Me", which was released on July 6, 2018. Key sings in both Korean and English over the original melody alongside the British pop trio. The original Korean verses reflect the song's overall meaning, as Key asks a lover to stop pushing-and-pulling and were written by the singer himself.

On October 11, 2018, SM Entertainment announced that Key would make his solo debut in late November. Shortly after, on October 20, Key performed a special stage at Charm's fashion show during Seoul Fashion Week. He performed a new song called "Chemicals", which was later included in his album. Two weeks later, the single "Forever Yours", featuring Key's close friend and former Sistar member Soyou, was pre-released on November 6 along with a music video. On November 26, his first studio album, titled Face, was released, alongside a music video for the lead single "One of Those Nights", featuring Crush. Out of the ten songs included in the album, Key wrote the lyrics to four of them himself.

Following his solo debut, Key released his first Japanese extended play, Hologram, on December 26, 2018. The EP contains a total of five tracks, including title track "Hologram" and a Japanese version of "One of Those Nights". To celebrate his Japanese debut, Key held two live shows, titled Key Land, in Kobe and Yokohama on December 22 and December 25, respectively. His first solo concert in South Korea, titled The Agit: Key Land, was held in February 2019 in Seoul and consisted of 11 sold-out performances.

I Wanna Be, a repackaged version of Face, was released on March 4, 2019; the album was preceded by the single "Cold", featuring Hanhae, and the title track "I Wanna Be", which featured Soyeon of (G)I-dle. On the same day the album was released, Key enlisted for his mandatory military service as a member of the military band.

2020–present: Bad Love and Gasoline
Key went on his final military leave on September 24, 2020, without returning to the army due to military protocols regarding the COVID-19 pandemic, before officially being discharged on October 7. He returned as a regular cast member for DoReMi Market on its November 21 episode. In July 2021, he joined I Live Alone as a cast member following a guest appearance several months prior. 

On August 30, 2021, Key released the single "Hate That...", featuring Taeyeon, serving as the pre-release for his upcoming album in September. He held an online Beyond Live concert, titled Groks in the Keyland, on September 26. The concert was also broadcast live in theaters.  His first Korean extended play, Bad Love, was released on September 27, with the lead single of the same name. On October 9, Key received his first music show win as a solo artist on MBC's Show! Music Core.

On August 30, 2022, Key released his second studio album Gasoline, with the lead single of the same name. He held a concert titled G.O.A.T. (Greatest of All Time) in the Keyland at Jangchung Arena in Seoul on October 22–23, and at Pia Arena MM in Yokohama on November 19–20. He will hold additional performances in Osaka in March 2023. On February 13, he released a reissue of Gasoline titled Killer.

Personal life
Key was raised by his grandmother from birth; his mother was sick after giving birth and his father was busy with work. On October 10, 2014, Key announced on his Instagram account that his grandmother had died on September 23, 2014. He stated that he wanted to announce it himself because it did not feel right for the news to be announced through his company.

Key graduated from Myongji University with a degree in Film and Musicals. He attended Woosuk University for his postgraduate degree, majoring in Culture and Education Contents Development. He participated in a project on youth self-concept development started by students in his major. He conducted special seminars at Iksan Namseong Middle School, North Jeolla Province, and Gimje Girls' Middle School in Seoul. His thesis is titled "The Influence of Styling Education on Appearance Satisfaction and Self-Esteem of Korean Adolescents".

Other ventures

Fashion

Key is considered one of the best dressed men in his country. His "unique and unconventional" style often mixes patterns and colors. In the media, his fashion has been compared to that of fellow idol G-Dragon; both are known to eschew trends in favor of pursuing their own distinct style. Key has stated that he enjoys trying new things to look different from others and that instead of being constrained by fashion, he cares more about the attitude towards fashion. He views fashion as a form of self-expression and prefers not to distinguish between masculine and feminine styles.

Key has ventured into the fashion industry. For instance, he collaborated with designer Ko Tae-yong on self-designed sweatshirts depicting his dogs and sold them for charity. In addition, he was appointed one of SM Entertainment's fashion directors and has been designing Shinee's concert outfits since 2015. The costumes for Shinee's 2015 single "View" were based on Key's ideas, adopting a vintage, skater-inspired aesthetic at a time when other groups mostly wore uniforms. In 2016, Key collaborated with Japanese illustrator Bridge Ship House for Shinee's fifth Korean concert tour Shinee World V. His primary goal was to achieve a balance between Shinee's identity as a group and each member's individual identities. Key also became a special editor for the Korean Elle, sharing his personal lifestyle in a column called "Key Story", which was released bi-weekly by the magazine. He shared tips on colour contact lenses, cameras, applications, and more. In March 2017, Key worked with model Irene Kim to design new products for fashion brand Charm's.

Endorsements
In January 2016, Key became a model for Jill Stuart Accessory. A representative explained that Key was chosen for the brand because he had promoted professionally in a variety of areas such as music and broadcasting, which showed an artistic aspect that overlapped with the fashion concept of the brand. In 2021, he was selected as a model for health and beauty store Olive Young alongside labelmate Taeyeon, in a campaign targeting younger consumers. He launched a skincare line named Key: Face in collaboration with Youlief, for which he personally designed the products. In 2022, he was appointed an ambassador for make-up brand Espoir. Soju brand HiteJinro introduced a black tea tonic drink based on a viral recipe invented by Key, promoted with "Key is back" packaging. It sold over 3.5 million bottles in four months, making it the fastest-selling product in the Jinro Tonic line, and contributing to an 83% increase in annual sales. In 2023, he began endorsing McDonald's, appearing in advertisements for their new burger.

Philanthropy
In 2012, Key and his fans from Korea, China, Japan, Taiwan, Singapore, Thailand and seven other countries donated 2.12 tons of rice to World Vision, which was used to feed 17,000 undernourished children and elderly people across 11 cities. In 2014, for Key's birthday, fans raised a total of 2 million won and established a well in Cambodia. The money raised also contributed to medical aid for poor children. In 2015, Key posted on his Instagram account encouraging fans to help citizens in Nepal following an earthquake. In the same year, Key collaborated with designer Ko Tae-yong and sold sweatshirts depicting his dogs. All proceeds (approximately 12.5 million won) were later donated to the Animal Freedom Union. In 2016, Key, along with groupmate Taemin and other artists from SM Entertainment, participated in the "Make a Promise" campaign organised by UNICEF and Louis Vuitton, whereby 40% of the proceeds were donated through UNICEF to children in need. In January 2022, he donated products from his Youlief skincare line worth 12 million won to the Korean Unwed Mothers' Families Association.

Discography

 Face (2018)
Gasoline (2022)

Songwriting credits 
All songwriting credits are adapted from the Korea Music Copyright Association.

Filmography

Film

Television series

Television shows

Reality shows

Web shows

Hosting

Theatre

Concerts

Headlining
 Key Land (2018)
 The Agit: Key Land (2019)
 Groks in the Keyland (2021)
 G.O.A.T. (Greatest of All Time) in the Keyland (2022–2023)

Concert participation
 SM Town Live 2023: SMCU Palace at Kwangya (2023)

Awards and nominations

References

External links

Key at SM Town

1991 births
Living people
People from Daegu
South Korean singer-songwriters
South Korean male musical theatre actors
South Korean television presenters
Japanese-language singers of South Korea
South Korean pop singers
South Korean dance musicians
South Korean male singers
South Korean male idols
Myongji University alumni
Shinee members
South Korean male television actors
21st-century South Korean singers
SM Entertainment artists
South Korean male singer-songwriters
South Korean baritones